It Could Only Happen with You is the final album by American pianist and arranger Duke Pearson featuring performances recorded in 1970 but not released on the Blue Note label until 1974.

Reception

The AllMusic review by Stephen Thomas Erlewine states "Duke Pearson followed the conventions of the time and cut a smooth, commercially-oriented jazz album that made allusions to traditional and contemporary pop, hard bop, soul-jazz and bossa nova... Although the record is a pleasant artifact of its time, it's a rather sad, undistinguished way to close out Pearson's career.

Track listing
 "Gira, Girou (Round and Round)" (Milton Nascimento) – 7:20      
 "It Could Only Happen with You" (Antônio Carlos Jobim, Louis Oliveira, Ray Gilbert) – 3:35
 "Book's Bossa" (Walter Booker, Cedar Walton) – 6:35     
 "Hermeto" (Hermeto Pascoal) – 5:35
 "Lost in the Stars" (Kurt Weill, Maxwell Anderson) – 3:27     
 "Stormy" (Buddy Buie, J. R. Cobb) – 3:35       
 "Emily" (Johnny Mandel, Johnny Mercer) – 4:00
Recorded at Van Gelder Studio, Englewood Cliffs NJ on February 13 (track 7) & April 10 (tracks 1-6), 1970

Personnel
Duke Pearson - piano, electric piano
Burt Collins, Joe Shepley (tracks 1-6) - trumpet
Kenny Rupp - trombone
Hermeto Pascoal - flute, guitar, bass (tracks 1-6)
Jerry Dodgion (track 8). Al Gibbons (tracks 1-7) - alto saxophone, alto flute 
Frank Foster - tenor saxophone (tracks 1-6)
Lew Tabackin - tenor saxophone, flute (track 7)
Bob Cranshaw - bass, electric bass (tracks 1-6)
Ron Carter - bass (track 7)
Mickey Roker - drums
Flora Purim - vocals (tracks 1, 2 & 6)

References

Blue Note Records albums
Duke Pearson albums
1974 albums
Albums recorded at Van Gelder Studio
Albums produced by Duke Pearson